Song Won-geun (born December 17, 1982) is a South Korean singer and actor. Song made his entertainment debut in 2000 as a member of the boyband OPPA, singing in the group's second album Reincarnation. He then launched his career as a solo artist under the stage name RUN, releasing one album and two singles in 2008 to 2009. Song also began acting in 2010, and has since starred in several stage musicals and television dramas.

Discography

Filmography

Television series

Variety show

Musical theatre

References

External links

 http://instagram.com/swg_1126

1986 births
Living people
South Korean male musical theatre actors
South Korean male television actors
South Korean male singers
South Korean pop singers
South Korean male web series actors
K-pop singers